George IV Gurieli (died 1726), of the House of Gurieli, was Prince of Guria from 1711 to 1726, and a king of Imereti in western Georgia in 1716. He was installed as regent of Guria by his father, Mamia III Gurieli, then the king of Imereti, in 1712. In 1716, he seized the crown of Imereti, but was forced to abandon the enterprise later that year. Returning to Guria, his rule was challenged by a faction of local nobility, which included his mother Elene and brother Kaikhosro III Gurieli. He was finally able to crush the opposition after making peace with Bezhan Dadiani, Prince of Mingrelia.

Early rule 
Giorgi was the eldest son of Mamia III Gurieli, Prince of Guria, and Elene, daughter of Prince Giorgi Abashidze. When Mamia seized the throne of Imereti in October 1712, Giorgi was made by his father as regent of Guria to the opposition of his younger brother, Levan. On Mamia's death on 5 January 1714, Giorgi Gurieli became prince-regnant. In 1716, the Imeretian opposition led by Bezhan Dadiani, Prince of Mingrelia, and Prince Zurab Abashidze invited the Ottoman troops in their successful bid to depose King Giorgi VII of Imereti, the late Mamia Gurieli's rival, and crowned Giorgi Gurieli as king at Kutaisi. His reign lasted for only three months; the dethroned king Giorgi VII's Rachian supporters ambushed and looted Gurieli's treasure, bound to Kutaisi, at Salominao, while a Gurian escort were captured and sold in slavery. The alarmed Gurieli fled Kutaisi back to Guria, while Imereti was divided by Dadiani, Abashidze, and the duke of Racha.

Coup in Guria 
Back in his native principality, Giorgi Gurieli faced a coup engineered by his own mother, Elene, on whose instigation Dadiani, Abashidze, and the duke of Racha intervened with their troops to expel Giorgi and replace him with his younger brother, Kaikhosro III Gurieli, the unfrocked monk and Elene's favorite son. Giorgi fled to Akhlatsikhe under the protection of an Ottoman pasha. There he met his exiled predecessor as king of Imereti, Giorgi VII, who married Gurieli's sister Tamar. Akhaltsikhe's own power struggle deprived the two Giorgis of any meaningful support. Gurieli moved to Erzurum and, with the troops provided by the local pasha, quickly reconquered Guria, forcing his mother and brothers into exile.

The leading nobles of Guria, such as Eristavi and Bezhan Nakashidze did not welcome Giorgi's comeback and invoked Bezhan Dadiani's military aid to put Gurieli into flight to Batumi. Dadiani looted Guria and left. Gurieli was able to resume his reign and made peace with Dadiani. He then moved against his estranged nobles, expelled Eristavi, and took away Giorgi Nakashidze's wife, a daughter of Dadiani, as his own mate with her father's consent. Giorgi Gurieli died in 1726. He was succeeded by his son, Mamia IV Gurieli.

Family  
Giorgi Gurieli was married twice, first to Elene (Mariam), daughter of Prince Abashidze or, according to Cyril Toumanoff, of Giorgi Shervashidze, Eristavi of Guria. After the couple's divorce in 1717, Giorgi married Khvaramze, daughter of Bezhan Dadiani and former wife of Prince Giorgi Nakashidze. After Gurieli's death, Khvaramze married Shoshita III, Duke of Racha. Giorgi had two sons:

 Mamia IV Gurieli
 Giorgi V Gurieli

References 

1726 deaths
Kings of Imereti
Year of birth unknown
House of Gurieli
Eastern Orthodox monarchs
18th-century people from Georgia (country)